Daniel Beichler (born 13 October 1988) is an Austrian former professional footballer who played as a striker.

Career
After three years playing in Germany, in 2013 he returned to Austria to sign with SK Sturm Graz.

He joined SKN St. Pölten in the Austrian Football First League for the start of the 2015–16 season.

Career statistics

References

External links
 

1988 births
Living people
Austrian footballers
Footballers from Graz
Austria youth international footballers
Austria under-21 international footballers
Austria international footballers
Association football forwards
SK Sturm Graz players
Reggina 1914 players
Hertha BSC II players
Hertha BSC players
MSV Duisburg players
SV Ried players
SV Sandhausen players
Austrian Football Bundesliga players
2. Liga (Austria) players
Austrian Regionalliga players
2. Bundesliga players
Regionalliga players
Swiss Super League players
Austrian expatriate footballers
Austrian expatriate sportspeople in Germany
Expatriate footballers in Germany
Expatriate footballers in Switzerland
Expatriate footballers in Italy